Charles S. Taylor may refer to:

 Charles S. Taylor, signatory of the Texas Declaration of Independence
 Charles Simeon Taylor (1851–1913), American politician
 Charles Taylor (Conservative politician) (Charles Stuart Taylor, 1910–1989), English politician